The Patriot District is a high school district in the state of Virginia that includes schools from eastern Fairfax County.

District History
The Patriot District was founded in 1993 as part of an attempted realignment of the Northern Region. The charter members included Annandale, Hayfield, Lake Braddock, Robinson, T.C. Williams and West Springfield.

The Patriot District experienced some changes in 2005 due to realignment and the opening of South County in Lorton.  The Patriot District was determined by the Northern Region at least initially to hold only Division 6 schools, and moved Robert E. Lee from the Liberty District to the Patriot.  However, Robinson, a perennial Patriot member in the past was moved to the Concorde District, which caused some controversy, as it severed their rivalry with Lake Braddock.  In 2009, Hayfield moved to the National District, and was replaced by W.T. Woodson and in 2015 Robert E. Lee left to join the National District. In 2017 as part of a statewide realignment,

Membership History

Current members
Alexandria City Titans of Alexandria
Fairfax Lions of Fairfax
Lake Braddock Bruins of Burke
Robinson Rams of Fairfax
South County Stallions of Lorton
W.T. Woodson Cavaliers of Fairfax
West Potomac Wolverines of Alexandria
West Springfield Spartans of Springfield

Former Members
Annandale Atoms of Annandale (1994-2017)
Hayfield Hawks of Alexandria (1994-2009)
Mount Vernon Majors of Alexandria (2015-2017)
Robert E. Lee Lancers of Springfield (2005-2015)
T.C. Williams Titans of Alexandria (1994-2017)
West Potomac Wolverines of Alexandria (1994-2017)

Virginia High School League